The World Union of Karate Do Federations (WUKF) is the international governing body of sport karate with 45 member countries. The main headquarters of the organization is located in Herstal under the supervision of Belgium Ministry of Justice and Belgium Royal House. The events of this federation are held regularly every year in the member countries.

History 

In June 2009, at the scheduled congress, affiliate members will discuss and decide on all decisions necessary for the good work of the organization. The name is new but the organization is the same, all former (WUKO) affiliates have sent support letters (except FESIK and 4 other federations), all (WUKF) events are scheduled as before, the organization will continue to live.

Members

References

External links 

 Official WUKF site

Karate in Belgium
Karate organizations
Sports governing bodies in Belgium
Sports organizations established in 2005